Yatil Devon Green (born November 25, 1973) is a former professional American football player. A 6'2", 205 lbs. wide receiver from the University of Miami, he was selected by the Miami Dolphins in the 1st round (15th overall pick) of the 1997 NFL Draft, as Miami saw him as a much-needed speed receiver to add to a solid but unspectacular group of possession wideouts. He was represented by Miami-based sports agent, Drew Rosenhaus.

However, on the first day of training camp, Green tore his quadriceps muscles, anterior cruciate ligament and cartilage in his right knee. Green came back the next year with Miami again pinning all of the team's downfield threat hopes on him (they did not draft, trade for, or sign any receivers with great speed during the 1998 offseason), but again tore the same ACL in training camp. In his third and only season playing, 1999, he played in 9 games catching 18 passes for 234 yards and no touchdowns, leaving him an afterthought in a passing offense that had a healthy Tony Martin and was also impeded by Dan Marino's subpar play in what turned out to be his final season. After three years and a total of 10 surgeries on his right knee, he was cut by the Dolphins after the 1999 year was and signed by the New York Jets, but never played a down and was cut during the season. After missing the entire 2000 season, he signed with the Oakland Raiders in 2001 but was cut during preseason.

References

1973 births
Living people
Players of American football from Gainesville, Florida
American football wide receivers
Miami Hurricanes football players
Miami Dolphins players